The 2019 Washington State Cougars football team represented Washington State University during the 2019 NCAA Division I FBS football season. The team played their home games in Martin Stadium in Pullman, Washington. They were led by 8th-year head coach Mike Leach and competed as members of the North Division of the Pac-12 Conference.

Previous season
The 2018 season was one of the greatest in Washington State history. Despite being predicted to finish fifth place in the Pac-12 North division by the Pac-12 media poll, the Cougars won a school record-tying ten games, the first time they had won that many in the regular season since the Rose Bowl year of 2002. They also surged as high as seventh in major polling and went into the Apple Cup with a chance to clinch the Pac-12 North title and a shot at the Rose Bowl, but lost 28–15 to rival Washington in the snow in Pullman, a sixth consecutive loss to the Huskies. The  Cougars were invited to the Alamo Bowl in San Antonio to play the Iowa State Cyclones. They won 28–26 for a school record 11th win.

Preseason

Pac-12 media days

Pac-12 media polls
In the Pac-12 preseason media poll, Washington State was voted to finish in fourth place in the North Division and fifth place in the Pac-12 Championship.

Schedule

Schedule Source:

Rankings

Personnel

Coaching staff
Staff for the 2019 season.

Roster

Source:

Game summaries

New Mexico State

Northern Colorado

vs. Houston

UCLA

at Utah

at Arizona State

Colorado

at Oregon

at California

Stanford

Oregon State

at Washington

vs. Air Force (Cheez-It Bowl)

Awards

NFL draft

References

Washington State
Washington State Cougars football seasons
Washington State Cougars football